The first season of the Canadian police drama Rookie Blue began airing on June 24, 2010 with a simultaneous premiere on Global in Canada and ABC in the U.S. On July 12, 2010, four days after the third episode was broadcast, it was announced that the show had been renewed for a second season. The first season completed its run on September 9, 2010 with a double episode airing.

Production
The series is set and filmed in Toronto. The first season was produced in 2009 by Canwest, Thump Inc., and E1 Entertainment. The season was shot on 35mm film. Tassie Cameron, a co-creator of the series, served as showrunner for the first season. Cameron described the premise and her inspiration for the show as, "A sort of primal theme that’s interested me is imposter syndrome and the feeling I think everybody has: if you’re new at something you feel like a fraud. So what if it was that, but with guns?" The cast had one day of training with real police officers. During production Rookie Blue was known as Copper.

There was a very extensive promotional campaign in Canada for the premiere of Rookie Blue. This included spots during the season finales of the top rated shows on Global, theatrical trailers, billboards in Toronto, Calgary, and Vancouver, print ads in major daily newspapers, an online game in which people could get a feel for what it is like to be a rookie police officer, online ads on some of the most popular sites, including TMZ.com, Perez Hilton's blog, Yahoo!, and
AOL, and on June 24, 2010 every broadcast and cable channel owned by Canwest carried hourly promotional spots for the premiere that night.

Ratings
In announcing the renewal of the series Canwest included revised figures of 2.1 million viewers, which makes it the most watched premiere of a Canadian drama series in more than a decade and the highest rated premiere for an original series commissioned by Canwest. The Canadian ratings company BBM Canada originally reported 1.9 million viewers.

In the United States the premiere was the most successful scripted summer debut in over a year and in nearly six years for ABC. "Fresh Paint" drew 7.253 million viewers and an audience share in the 18–49 demographic of 2.0/6, according to overnight figures.

Cast

Main Cast 
 Missy Peregrym as Officer Andy McNally
 Gregory Smith as Officer Dov Epstein
 Eric Johnson as Detective Luke Callaghan
 Enuka Okuma as Officer Traci Nash
 Travis Milne as Officer Chris Diaz 
 Charlotte Sullivan as Officer Gail Peck
 Noam Jenkins as Detective Jerry Barber
 Matt Gordon as Officer Oliver Shaw
 Lyriq Bent as Sergeant Frank Best
 Ben Bass as Officer Sam Swarek

Recurring 
 Melanie Nicholls-King as Officer Noelle Williams
 Adam MacDonald as Detective Steve Peck
 Aidan Devine as Sergeant Boyko

Episodes

U.S. Nielsen ratings
The following is a table for the United States ratings, based on average total estimated viewers per episode, of Rookie Blue on ABC.

References

External links
  for Global
  for ABC
 
 List of Rookie Blue episodes at The Futon Critic
 List of Rookie Blue episodes at MSN TV

2010 Canadian television seasons